Site 44GL103, Quest End, is a historic home and archaeological site located at Selden, Gloucester County, Virginia.  The property includes a two-story, frame house and
late 19th/early 20th century farm complex, with barn and smokehouse, known since the mid-20th
century as Quest End.  It was the site of an early colonial plantation.  The property includes an early 18th-century brick foundation measuring 36 feet by 20 feet with a partially plastered cellar.  The first historic occupation likely followed an initial patent in 1666 by Tobias Hansford.

It was added to the National Register of Historic Places in 2008.

References

Archaeological sites on the National Register of Historic Places in Virginia
Houses on the National Register of Historic Places in Virginia
Houses completed in 1900
Houses in Gloucester County, Virginia
National Register of Historic Places in Gloucester County, Virginia